Michael or Mike Golden may refer to:

 Michael Golden (comics), American comic book and graphic novel artist and writer
 Michael Golden (actor) (1913–1983), Irish-born English stage, film and television actor
 Michael Golden (businessman), American publisher
 Mike Golden (baseball) (1851–1929), baseball player
 Michael Golden (judge) (born 1942), Wyoming Supreme Court justice
 Mike Golden (ice hockey), American ice hockey forward
 Mike Golden, front man of the band Mike Golden and Friends